This is a list of notable people who have been diagnosed with or suspected to have chronic fatigue syndrome (CFS), also known as myalgic encephalomyelitis (ME).

Confirmed diagnosis

Suspected cases

References

Chronic fatigue syndrome
chronic fatigue syndrome